The 2018–19 FIS Snowboard World Cup was the 25th World Cup season in snowboarding organised by International Ski Federation. The season started on 8 September 2018 in Cardrona, New Zealand and concluded on 24 March 2019 in  Winterberg, Germany. Competitions consisted of parallel slalom, parallel giant slalom, snowboard cross, halfpipe, slopestyle and big air.

Men

Snowboard Cross

Parallel

Big Air

Halfpipe

Slopestyle

Ladies

Snowboard Cross

Parallel

Big Air

Halfpipe

Slopestyle

Team

Parallel mixed

Men's standings

Parallel overall (PSL/PGS)

Parallel slalom

Parallel giant slalom

Snowboard Cross

Freestyle overall (BA/SBS/HP)

Big Air

Halfpipe

Slopestyle

Ladies' standings

Parallel overall (PSL/PGS)

Parallel slalom

Parallel giant slalom

Snowboard Cross

Freestyle overall (BA/SBS/HP)

Big Air

Halfpipe

Slopestyle

Team

Parallel Slalom Team

Nations Cup

Overall

References 

FIS Snowboard World Cup
FIS Snowboard World Cup
FIS Snowboard World Cup